Jeanne Sagan (born January 11, 1979 in Springfield, Massachusetts) is an American musician. She is the bassist and backing vocalist for the heavy metal band Crossing Rubicon, but is best known as the former bassist and backing vocalist for the heavy metal-metalcore band All That Remains from 2006 to 2015. Before joining All That Remains, she was bassist in the band The Acacia Strain in 2003. In 2006, she was asked to join All That Remains after bassist Matt Deis left the band. She originally worked merchandise tables for Prosthetic Records.

As of November 2012, Sagan plays a black cherry Spector Legend 4 Classic four-string bass with EMG 35DC active pickups, and Ampeg SVT bass amplifiers. She is a former Ibanez player, using both Soundgear 4-strings and an ARTB100 four-string, the latter of which can be seen in the music video for the song "Hold On" from the album For We Are Many. She uses Orange amplifiers and Omega speaker cabinets.

In October 2015, Sagan announced her amicable departure from All That Remains in order to pursue personal interests. She was replaced by Aaron "Bubble" Patrick, formerly of the band Bury Your Dead. She currently plays bass and backing vocals in Crossing Rubicon, alongside her husband, frontman Scotty Anarchy.

Discography

Light is the Language
 The Void Falls Silent - (2001)

All That Remains
 The Fall of Ideals - (2006)
 Overcome - (2008)
 For We Are Many - (2010)
 A War You Cannot Win - (2012)
 The Order of Things - (2015)

Crossing Rubicon
 No Less Than Everything - (2016)
 Seeing Red - (2019)

References

 https://web.archive.org/web/20080417031905/http://www.ibanez.com/artists/
 https://web.archive.org/web/20110707124430/http://ibanez.s3.amazonaws.com/Cms/Bulk/ibanez_SR.swf

Gallery

1979 births
Living people
Women bass guitarists
Musicians from Springfield, Massachusetts
American heavy metal bass guitarists
Guitarists from Massachusetts
American women guitarists
All That Remains (band) members
21st-century American women musicians
21st-century American bass guitarists
The Acacia Strain members